Iván Cano García (born 1987) is a Mexican professional boxer who challenged for the WBC lightweight title in 2015.

Professional career
Cano lost to Dierry Jean for the North American Boxing Federation and North American Boxing Association super lightweight titles, and to Jorge Linares for the World Boxing Council lightweight title.

Cano fought Javier Prieto twice in 2014 with both fights resulting in a draw.

References

External links

1987 births
Living people
Mexican male boxers
Lightweight boxers
People from Tlalnepantla de Baz
Boxers from the State of Mexico